Kings Ferry is an unincorporated community in Nassau County, Florida, United States. It is at the northern ends of County Road 115A and County Road 121A, near the center of the county.

Geography
Kings Ferry is located at  (30.785, -81.8392) on the south side of the St. Marys River.

References

Unincorporated communities in Nassau County, Florida
Unincorporated communities in the Jacksonville metropolitan area
Unincorporated communities in Florida